HMS Swordfish was one of two s which served with the Royal Navy.  She was launched on 27 February 1895 by Armstrong Mitchell and Co at Elswick and sold off in 1910.

Construction
HMS Swordfish was ordered on 8 December 1893, the first of two "Twenty-Seven Knotter" destroyers ordered from Armstrong Mitchell and Co as part of the 1893–1894 construction programme for the Royal Navy, with in total, 36 destroyers being ordered from various shipbuilders for this programme.

Swordfish was laid down at Armstrong's, Elswick, Newcastle-on-Tyne shipyard on 4 June 1894. Construction was delayed by industrial action and was not launched until 27 February 1895. Sea trials began in March, but excessive vibration caused one of the ship's propeller shafts to be bent. A further attempt at trials in July suffered the same problem, and re-balancing of the ship's machinery was required to resolve the vibration problems. When trials were again attempted, fouling of the ship's hull resulted in the contract speed of 27 knots not being reached, although, eventually, Swordfish managed to reach an average speed of  during her official three-hour trial, when her engines generated . Swordfish was not finally accepted until December 1896, 21 months after the contracted date of 31 March 1895.

The two Armstrong-built Twenty-seven knotters were not popular in service, with Armstrongs not being invited to tender for the Thirty-knot destroyers required in the next few shipbuilding programmes.

Operational history
Swordfish was commissioned on 7 March 1900 as tender to HMS Wildfire, flagship at Sheerness. She was based at Chatham in 1901, also serving at Sheerness and Portsmouth. In April 1902 she had finished a refit at Sheerness, and the following month she was commissioned at Chatham by Lieutenant Julian Walter Elmslie Townsend and the crew of the destroyer , taking that ship's place in the Medway Instructional Flotilla. She took part in the fleet review held at Spithead on 16 August 1902 for the coronation of King Edward VII, and was back with the flotilla later the same month.

While most of the 27-knotters mounted their full armament of 1 × 12 pounder (76 mm) gun, 5 × 6-pounder guns and two 18-in torpedo tubes, Swordfish, owing to concerns about stability, tended to only carry a single torpedo tube. By 1905, it was stated by the Rear Admiral (Destroyers), that Swordfish was one of a number of destroyers that were "..all worn out" and that "every shilling spent on these old 27-knotters is a waste of money".

Swordfish was sold for scrap to John Cashmore Ltd of Newport, Wales on 11 October 1910 for £1510.

Notes

Citations

Bibliography
 

 

Swordfish-class destroyers
Ships built on the River Tyne
1895 ships
A-class destroyers (1913)
Ships built by Armstrong Whitworth